The Incredible and Sad Tale of Innocent Eréndira and her Heartless Grandmother is a 1972 short story by Colombian writer Gabriel García Márquez.

Plot summary
This is the story of a twelve year old who accidentally sets fire to the house where she lives with her grandmother. The grandmother decides that Erendira must pay her back for the loss, and sells her into prostitution in order to make money. The story takes on the characteristics of a bizarre fairy tale, with the evil grandmother forcing her Cinderella-like granddaughter to sell her body. They travel all over for several years, with men lining up for miles to enjoy her.

Meanwhile, Erendira falls in love. Her lover tries to poison the grandmother with arsenic in a birthday cake and to blow her up with a homemade bomb, but she survives all this and continues to dominate, until Erendira's lover finally stabs the grandmother to death. By the time he regains his composure, Erendira has fled alone.

Adaptations
The short story was adapted to the 1983 art film Eréndira, directed by Ruy Guerra. Irene Papas acted as the Grandmother and Cláudia Ohana as Eréndira. Violeta Dinescu's opera Eréndira, to a German-language libretto, premiered in 1992 in Stuttgart.

References

External links
 The Incredible and Sad Tale of Innocent Eréndira and Her Heartless Grandmother, Esquire, 18 April 2014
Book review in The New Yorker

1978 novels
Colombian novellas
Colombian novels adapted into films
Short stories by Gabriel García Márquez
Novels about Colombian prostitution